63305 Bobkepple, provisional designation , is a carbonaceous Hygiean asteroid from the outer regions of the asteroid belt, approximately  in diameter. It was discovered on 17 March 2001, by astronomer David Healy at the Junk Bond Observatory in Arizona, United States. The asteroid was named after Bob Kepple, co-author of The Night Sky Observer’s Guide.

Orbit and classification 

Bobkepple is a member of the Hygiea family, a large family of carbonaceous outer-belt asteroids, named after 10 Hygiea, the main belt's fourth-largest asteroid. It orbits the Sun in the outer main-belt at a distance of 2.7–3.7 AU once every 5 years and 9 months (2,091 days). Its orbit has an eccentricity of 0.15 and an inclination of 6° with respect to the ecliptic.

The body's observation arc begins with a precovery image taken by Spacewatch in March 1995, six years prior to its official discovery observation at Junk Bond Observatory.

Physical characteristics

Rotation period 

As of 2017, no rotational lightcurve of Bobkepple has been obtained from photometric observations. The asteroid's rotation period, spin axis and shape remains unknown.

Diameter and albedo 

According to the survey carried out by the NEOWISE mission of NASA's Wide-field Infrared Survey Explorer, Bobkepple measures 6.216 kilometers in diameter and its surface has an albedo of 0.055.

Naming 

This minor planet was named after deep-sky astronomer George Robert Kepple, creator of the "Astro Cards" observing aids and co-author of The Night Sky Observer’s Guide, popular among deep-sky observers. The official naming citation was published by the Minor Planet Center on 4 May 2004.

References

External links 
 The Night Sky Observer’s Guide by George Robert Kepple and Glen Sanner
 Asteroid Lightcurve Database (LCDB), query form (info )
 Dictionary of Minor Planet Names, Google books
 Asteroids and comets rotation curves, CdR – Observatoire de Genève, Raoul Behrend
 Discovery Circumstances: Numbered Minor Planets (60001)-(65000) – Minor Planet Center
 
 

063305
Discoveries by David Healy (astronomer)
Named minor planets
20010317